David Begg may refer to:
 David Begg (broadcaster)
 David Begg (trade unionist)